Ghaem Metro Station is a station in line 3 of the Tehran Metro. It is located at Shahrak-e Qa'em in Northeastern Tehran. Ghaem Station is the Northeastern terminus of Tehran's line 3.

The station is located in the proximity of Islamic Azad University, Central Tehran Branch - Velayat Campus.

References

Tehran Metro stations
Railway stations opened in 2015
2015 establishments in Iran